The Myla is a river in Yakutia (Sakha Republic), Russia.

The Myla is one of the largest rivers of Megino-Kangalassky District. The villages of Khocho, Tympai, Olyongnekh-Sayylyk and Khaptagay are located near the river.

Course  
The Myla is a right tributary of the Lena. It is formed near Khocho village in a taiga area with numerous small lakes. The river heads in a roughly northwestern direction, between the Tamma to the south and the Suola to the north across Megino-Kangalassky District. In the upper course there are stretches where it flows across lakes and parts where it may dry up in certain years. After flowing across the Lena floodplain, the Myla meets the Khaptagay arm of the right bank of the Lena  from its source near the village of Khaptagay, south of Yakutsk.

The river freezes between October and May.

See also
List of rivers of Russia

References

External links 

Fishing & Tourism in Yakutia

Rivers of the Sakha Republic